Larry Hunter (August 8, 1949 – May 4, 2018) was an American former college basketball coach.  He served as the head basketball coach at Wittenberg University from 1976 to 1989, Ohio University from 1989 to 2001, and Western Carolina University from 2005 to 2018, compiling a career college basketball coaching record of 702–453.  As head coach of the Ohio Bobcats men's basketball team from 1989 to 2001, he had a record of 204–148.  His Bobcats teams made one NCAA Division I men's basketball tournament appearance in 1994, an NIT appearance in 1995, and won the Preseason NIT in 1994. Despite his winning record and being second on Ohios' all-time wins list with only two losing seasons, he was fired in 2001.  Hunter also played at Ohio University from 1970 to 1971.

Ohio hired its alumnus away from Wittenberg University in Springfield, Ohio. Hunter was the head coach at Wittenberg for 13 seasons, leading the Tigers to the program's second NCAA Division III men's basketball tournament championship, in 1977, and garnered NABC Division III National Coach of the Year the same year. He was the first coach in NCAA history to win a national championship in his first season at a school. In total, Hunter won six regular season Ohio Athletic Conference championships and six Ohio Athletic Conference tournament championships during his tenure at Wittenberg. Before moving to Western Carolina University, he was an assistant coach and an associate head coach under Herb Sendek at North Carolina State University. On March 4, 2018, Hunter announced that he was stepping down as coach of Western Carolina.

Less than two months after he stepped down at Western Carolina, he suffered a stroke and was sent to a hospital in Cary, North Carolina, where he died less than a week later.

Head coaching record

Basketball

Soccer

See also
 List of college men's basketball coaches with 600 wins

References

1949 births
2018 deaths
American men's basketball coaches
Basketball coaches from Ohio
Basketball players from Ohio
College men's basketball head coaches in the United States
College men's soccer coaches in the United States
Marietta Pioneers men's basketball coaches
NC State Wolfpack men's basketball coaches
Ohio Bobcats men's basketball coaches
Ohio Bobcats men's basketball players
Ohio University alumni
People from Athens, Ohio
Western Carolina Catamounts men's basketball coaches
Wittenberg Tigers men's basketball coaches
American men's basketball players
American soccer coaches